The commune of Gisozi is a commune of Mwaro Province in central Burundi. The capital lies at Gisozi.

References

Communes of Burundi
Mwaro Province